The Yard is a historic estate home located near Hot Springs, Bath County, Virginia. It was built in 1925, and is a large, Tudor Revival style dwelling.  The plan features an inner courtyard surrounded on three sides by two-story, one-room-deep wings, with the remaining side at one-story.  It is constructed of stone and half-timbered stucco, capped by a slate gable roof and punctuated by leaded glass casement windows and doors.  Also on the property are a contributing former foxhound kennel and chauffeur's shed.

It was listed on the National Register of Historic Places in 2007.

References

Houses on the National Register of Historic Places in Virginia
Tudor Revival architecture in Virginia
Houses completed in 1925
Houses in Bath County, Virginia
National Register of Historic Places in Bath County, Virginia
1925 establishments in Virginia